Brush-tailed rat is a common name for several mammals and may refer to:

Isothrix, a genus of five species primarily found in the Amazon Basin
Octodon degus, a species native to Chile, which appears in the exotic pet trade

See also
Brush-tailed rabbit rat